Dino Kluk (born 13 May 1991) is a professional Croatian football player, who plays for Trešnjevka.

Club career
He previously played for FK Dukla Prague in the Czech First League. He left Dukla in August 2015.

On 16 August 2019, Kluk joined NK Zagorec Krapina.

References

External links
 
 Dino Kluk at Footballdatabase

1991 births
Living people
Footballers from Zagreb
Association football defenders
Croatian footballers
SV Seekirchen players
NK Hrvatski Dragovoljac players
FK Dukla Prague players
FK Liepāja players
NK Lokomotiva Zagreb players
NK Sesvete players
NK Dubrava players
NK Zagorec Krapina players
NK Trešnjevka players
Croatian Football League players
First Football League (Croatia) players
Czech First League players
Latvian Higher League players
Croatian expatriate footballers
Expatriate footballers in the Czech Republic
Croatian expatriate sportspeople in the Czech Republic
Expatriate footballers in Latvia
Croatian expatriate sportspeople in Latvia